Rhinella acrolopha, also known as Cerro Mali beaked toad, is a species of toad in the family Bufonidae. It is found in the Serranía del Darién in eastern Panama (including the Darién National Park) and in the immediately adjacent northwestern Colombia, in the Los Katíos National Park. The specific name acrolopha is derived from the Greek akrolophos, meaning crest of a mountain or ridge, and refers to the isolated occurrence of this species at high elevations in the Serranía del Darién. However, the International Union for Conservation of Nature (IUCN) characterizes it as a lowland species.

Description
The snout is acuminate in dorsal aspect and long, directed anteroventrally, and terminally truncate in lateral aspect. Tympanum is absent. The supraorbital, postorbital, and supratympanic crests are present, while the pretympanic crest is variable in occurrence and the occipital crest is present but indistinct. The fingers have rudiments of webbing. The toes are partially webbed. Dorsal coloration varies from yellowish tan to reddish and dark brown. Some individuals have a partial or complete vertebral stripe. The iris is bronze with black reticulations.

Habitat and conservation
It is a terrestrial species. The known populations are within protected areas, outside of which it would probably be threatened by habitat loss caused by agricultural development, cultivation of illegal crops (pollution from spraying them), logging, and human settlement.

References

acrolopha
Amphibians of Colombia
Amphibians of Panama
Taxonomy articles created by Polbot